is a Japanese manga series written and illustrated by Kazuhiro Kiuchi. It was serialized in Kodansha's seinen manga magazine Weekly Young Magazine from 1983 to 2003, with its chapters collected in 48 tankōbon volumes. It has been adapted into seven live-action films, a video game, and an original video animation (OVA) series.

The manga has sold over 40 million copies, making it one of the best-selling manga series of all time. In 1988, the series won the 12th Kodansha Manga Award in the general category.

Story
Toru and Hiroshi style their hair in punch perms and also adopt exaggerated swaggering gaits. The manga also features an assortment of outlandish characters who also sport unusual fashions and hairdos.

Media

Manga
Written and illustrated by Kazuhiro Kiuchi, Be-Bop High School was serialized in Kodansha's seinen manga magazine Weekly Young Magazine from 1983 to 2003. Kodansha collected its chapters in forty-eight tankōbon volumes, released from March 17, 1984, to January 6, 2004.

A spin-off parody, titled , Memeoka Manhiru, was serialized in Bessatsu Young Magazine, and its chapters were collected in six tankōbon volumes, released from January 1990 to January 1996.

Live-action films
There are seven live-action films based on the manga; six films directed by Hiroyuki Nasu and released between 1985 and 1988, and a 1994 film directed by the own manga author, Kazuhiro Kiuchi.
 (December 14, 1985)
 (August 9, 1986)
 (March 21, 1987)
 (December 12, 1987)
 (August 6, 1988)
 (December 17, 1988)
 (February 19, 1994)

Video game
A video game, titled , was released on March 30, 1988, by Data East for the Nintendo Famicom console.

Original video animation
A seven-episode original video animation (OVA) adaptation, animated by Toei Animation, was released between January 26, 1990, to December 11, 1998. A three-episode OVA, based on Be-Bop Kaizokuban, was released between 1991 and 1993.

Drama
A special television drama adaptation of two episodes was broadcast on TBS on June 16, 2004, and August 17, 2005.

Reception
The manga has sold over 40 million copies. The series' eighth volume had a first print run of 2.27 million copies in 1987, making it the publisher's highest first print run of all time; the record was broken by Attack on Titans 13th volume in 2014, which had a first print run of 2.75 million copies.

In 1988, alongside Bonobono, Be-Bop High School won the 12th Kodansha Manga Award in the general category.

References

External links
 

1988 video games
Data East video games
Films directed by Hiroyuki Nasu
High school-themed video games
Japanese drama television series
Japan-exclusive video games
Kodansha manga
Live-action films based on manga
Manga adapted into television series
Nintendo Entertainment System-only games
Seinen manga
Video games developed in Japan
Winner of Kodansha Manga Award (General)
Yankī anime and manga